Paul Barnes (pseudonym of George Franklin Feger; October 10, 1868 – May 8, 1922) was a vaudeville comedic actor, singer, pianist, and songwriter who, with Will D. Cobb as lyricist, in 1897 composed the Spanish–American War-era hit, "Goodbye, Dolly Gray."

Selected works

Worked published by Cruger Bros., New York
The following works were published by Cruger Bros., New York: 

 "The moon and Crescent" (©1894), Paul Barnes (w&m) 
 "My Sweetheart Gets Married To Me," ballad (©1894), Paul Barnes (w&m), 
 "Love Me As I Love You," ballad (©1894), Paul Barnes (w&m), 
 "A Venetian Lullaby" (©1894), Emil Oscar Wolff (1858–1929) (music), Paul Barnes (words), 
 "Forget Me Not," ballad (©1894), Paul Barnes (w&m), 
 "In the Old Churchyard," ballad (©1894), Paul Barnes (w&m), 
 "Pretty Little Mary" (©1894), Paul Barnes (w&m), 
 "Please Come Home," ballad (©1894), Paul Barnes (w&m), 
 "Thoughts of Thee," ballad (©1894), Dox Cruger (music), Paul Barnes (words), 
 "Nellie Mavourneen Sweetheart" (©1894), Dox Cruger (music), Paul Barnes (words), 
 "I'm the Boy for Nellie" (©1894), Dox Cruger (music), Paul Barnes (words), 
 "Since Katie Moved Away," ballad (©1894), Paul Barnes (w&m), 
 "A Few Old Broken Playthings," ballad (©1894), Paul Barnes (w&m), 
 "Pretty Little Mountain Pink," ballad (©1894), Paul Barnes (w&m), 
 "Nannie Gray," ballad (©1894), Paul Barnes (w&m), 
 "Darling Nellie" (©1894), Paul Barnes (w&m), 
 "Dreamland," cradle song (©1894), Dox Cruger (music), Paul Barnes (words), 
 "The Ferryman" (©1894), Dox Cruger (music), Paul Barnes (words), 
 "The Bellman" (©1895), Paul Barnes (w&m), 
 "Heigh-Ho!" (©1894), Dox Cruger (music), Paul Barnes (words), 
 "Swinging on de Golden Gate" (©1894), Paul Barnes (w&m), 
 "Love by Telephone" (©1894), Emil Oscar Wolff (1858–1929) (music), Paul Barnes (words), 
 "What Do You Think of That?" (©1894), Paul Barnes (w&m),

Worked published by Morse Music Publishing Company
The following works were published by Morse Music Publishing Company:

 "Goodbye, Dolly Gray" (1897), Paul Barnes (music), Will D. Cobb (words)

Worked published by Howley, Haviland & Dresser
The following works were published by Howley, Haviland & Dresser:

 "Down by the Riverside" (©1900), Paul Barnes (w&m), 
 "Josephine, My Jo" (©1898), Paul Barnes (w&m), 
 "For I Want To Be a Soldier," comic song & chorus (©1898), Paul Barnes (w&m), 
 "One I Love, Two I Love" (©1900), Paul Barnes (w&m), 
 "I Love You Dearly, For I Love No One But You" (©1902), Paul Barnes (w&m), 
 "Buzzin' Around" (©1903), Paul Barnes (w&m), 
 "Down in the Meadow Where the Green Grass Grows" (©1903), Theodore F. Morse (music), Paul Barnes (words),

Worked published by Paul Dresser Publishing Company
The following works were published by Paul Dresser Publishing Company:

 "When the Right Little Girl Comes Along" (©1905), E. Ray Goetz (music), Paul Barnes (words),

Family 
Paul Barnes' father, Pvt. William J. Feger, was a musician (E cornetist) and organizer and leader of a band in the 48th Pennsylvania Infantry Regiment during the American Civil War under the command of Brig. Gen James Nagle.

Notes

References 

1868 births
1922 deaths
American male songwriters